
The following is a list of the birds recorded on Kangaroo Island, South Australia.

Emus
 Emu (introduced)
 Kangaroo Island emu (extinct)

Megapodes
 Australian brush-turkey (introduced)

Gamebirds
 Stubble quail
 Brown quail
 Indian peafowl (introduced)
 Common pheasant (introduced)
 Wild turkey (introduced)

Wildfowl
 Blue-billed duck
 Musk duck
 Freckled duck
 Black swan
 Cape Barren goose
 Australian shelduck
 Australian wood duck
 Pacific black duck
 Australian shoveler
 Grey teal 
 Chestnut teal
 Garganey (vagrant)
 Pink-eared duck
 Hardhead
 Mallard (introduced)

Grebes
 Australasian grebe
 Hoary-headed grebe
 Great crested grebe

Penguins
 Little penguin
 Fiordland penguin

Diving-petrels
 Common diving-petrel

Petrels and shearwaters
 Southern giant petrel
 Northern giant petrel
 Southern fulmar
 Cape petrel 
 Kerguelen petrel 
 Great-winged petrel 
 White-headed petrel 
 Blue petrel
 Broad-billed prion 
 Salvin's prion 
 Antarctic prion
 Slender-billed prion
 Fairy prion
 White-chinned petrel
 Mottled petrel
 Grey petrel
 Flesh-footed shearwater
 Short-tailed shearwater (migrates here to breed)
 Fluttering shearwater 
 Hutton's shearwater
 Sooty shearwater
 Little shearwater

Albatrosses
 Wandering albatross 
 Royal albatross 
 Black-browed albatross
 Shy albatross
 Grey-headed albatross
 Yellow-nosed albatross
 Sooty albatross
 Light-mantled sooty albatross

Storm-petrels
 Wilson's storm-petrel
 White-faced storm-petrel
 Grey-backed storm-petrel
 Black-bellied storm-petrel

Tropicbirds
 Red-tailed tropicbird

Gannets
 Australasian gannet

Darters
 Darter

Cormorants
 Little pied cormorant
 Black-faced cormorant
 Pied cormorant
 Little black cormorant
 Great cormorant

Pelicans
 Australasian pelican

Herons and allies
 White-faced heron
 Little egret
 Eastern reef egret
 White-necked heron
 Great egret 
 Cattle egret
 Nankeen night heron
 Australasian bittern
 Intermediate egret

Ibises and spoonbills
 Glossy ibis
 Australian white ibis
 Straw-necked ibis
 Royal spoonbill
 Yellow-billed spoonbill

Hawks and allies
 Black-shouldered kite
 Letter-winged kite 
 Square-tailed kite 
 Black kite
 Whistling kite
 White-bellied sea-eagle 
 Spotted harrier 
 Swamp harrier
 Brown goshawk
 Collared sparrowhawk
 Wedge-tailed eagle
 Little eagle

Osprey
 Osprey

Falcons
 Brown falcon
 Australian hobby
 Black falcon 
 Peregrine falcon
 Nankeen kestrel

Cranes
 Brolga

Rails
 Buff-banded rail
 Lewin's rail
 Baillon's crake
 Australian spotted crake
 Spotless crake
 Purple swamp-hen
 Dusky moorhen
 Black-tailed native-hen
 Common coot

Buttonquail
 Painted buttonquail

Sandpipers and allies
 Latham's snipe
 Black-tailed godwit
 Bar-tailed godwit
 Eurasian whimbrel
 Eastern curlew
 Marsh sandpiper
 Common greenshank
 Wood sandpiper
 Terek sandpiper
 Common sandpiper
 Grey-tailed tattler
 Ruddy turnstone
 Red knot
 Sanderling
 Red-necked stint
 Long-toed stint
 Pectoral sandpiper
 Sharp-tailed sandpiper
 Curlew sandpiper
 Great knot

Painted-snipe
 Australian painted snipe

Stone-curlews
 Bush stone-curlew

Oystercatchers
 Pied oystercatcher
 Sooty oystercatcher

Avocets and stilts
 Black-winged stilt
 Banded stilt 
 Red-necked avocet

Plovers
 Pacific golden plover
 Grey plover
 Red-capped plover
 Double-banded plover
 Lesser sand plover
 Greater sand plover
 Black-fronted dotterel
 Hooded plover
 Red-kneed dotterel
 Banded lapwing
 Masked lapwing

Skuas
 Antarctic skua 
 Arctic skua 
 Pomarine skua
 South polar skua

Gulls
 Pacific gull
 Kelp gull
 Silver gull

Terns
 Australian tern
 Caspian tern
 Crested tern
 White-fronted tern
 Common tern
 Antarctic tern
 Fairy tern
 Sooty tern
 Whiskered tern
 Arctic tern
 Little tern
 White-winged tern

Pigeons and doves
 Rock dove (introduced)
 Spotted dove (introduced)
 Common bronzewing
 Brush bronzewing
 Crested pigeon (introduced)
 Peaceful dove

Cockatoos
 Glossy black cockatoo
 Yellow-tailed black cockatoo
 Gang-gang cockatoo(introduced)
 Galah
 Little corella
 Sulphur-crested cockatoo
 Cockatiel
 Long-billed corella

Parrots
 Rainbow lorikeet
 Purple-crowned lorikeet
 musk lorikeet
 Crimson rosella
 Eastern rosella
 Budgerigar
 Elegant parrot
 Rock parrot
 Red-rumped parrot
 Eastern bluebonnet
 Mulga parrot
 Blue-winged parrot

Cuckoos
 Pallid cuckoo
 Fan-tailed cuckoo
 Horsfield's bronze-cuckoo
 Shining bronze-cuckoo
 Black-eared cuckoo

Barn owls
 Barn owl

Owls
 Australian boobook

Frogmouths
 Tawny frogmouth

Nightjars
 Spotted nightjar

Owlet-nightjars
 Australian owlet-nightjar

Swifts
 White-throated needletail
 Pacific swift

Kingfishers
 Laughing kookaburra (introduced)
 Sacred kingfisher

Bee-eaters
 Rainbow bee-eater

Rollers
 Dollarbird

Treecreepers
 White-throated treecreeper
 Brown treecreeper

Flowerpeckers
 Mistletoebird

Australo-Papuan wrens
 Variegated fairy-wren
 Superb fairy-wren
 Southern emu-wren

Pardalotes
 Spotted pardalote
 Striated pardalote

Thornbills and allies
 White-browed scrubwren
 Shy heathwren
 Brown thornbill
 Yellow thornbill
 Striated thornbill
 Yellow-rumped thornbill
 Inland thornbill
 White-throated gerygone
 Chestnut-rumped heathwren
 Southern whiteface

Honeyeaters
 Red wattlebird (Kangaroo Island sub-species)
 Little wattlebird
 Regent honeyeater
 Singing honeyeater
 White-eared honeyeater
 Purple-gaped honeyeater (Kangaroo Island sub-species)
 White-plumed honeyeater
 Brown-headed honeyeater
 White-naped honeyeater
 Crescent honeyeater (Kangaroo Island sub-species)
 New Holland honeyeater (Kangaroo Island sub-species)
 White-fronted honeyeater
 Tawny-crowned honeyeater
 Eastern spinebill
 Pied honeyeater
 Yellow-plumed honeyeater
 Yellow-faced honeyeater
 White-fronted honeyeater
 Noisy miner
 Yellow-throated miner
 Spiny-cheeked honeyeater
 Black honeyeater

Australian chats
 Crimson chat
 White-fronted chat

Australian robins
 Scarlet robin
 Flame robin
 Rose robin
 Jacky-winter

Whipbirds
 Western whipbird (Kangaroo Island sub-species)

Whistlers
 Golden whistler
 Rufous whistler
 Grey shrike-thrush

Monarch flycatchers
 Satin flycatcher
 Restless flycatcher

Mudnest-builders
 Magpie-lark

Fantails
 Grey fantail
 Willie wagtail

Drongos
 Spangled drongo (vagrant)

Cuckooshrikes
 Black-faced cuckooshrike
 White-winged triller

Sittellas
 Varied sittella

Woodswallows
 Masked woodswallow
 White-browed woodswallow
 Black-faced woodswallow
 Dusky woodswallow

Bellmagpies and allies
 Australian magpie
 Grey currawong (Kangaroo Island sub-species)
 Grey butcherbird

Crows
 Australian raven
 Little raven

Larks
 Singing bushlark
 Skylark

Pipits and wagtails
 Australian pipit

Old World sparrows
 House sparrow (introduced)

Waxbills and allies
 Red-browed finch
 Beautiful firetail
 Zebra finch

Finches
 Goldfinch (introduced)

Swallows and martins
 Welcome swallow
 Tree martin
 Fairy martin
 White-backed swallow

Old World warblers

 Australian reed warbler
 Little grassbird
 Brown songlark
 Rufous songlark

White-eyes
 Silvereye (a subspecies)

Thrushes
 Bassian thrush (a subspecies)
 Blackbird (introduced)

Starlings
 European starling (introduced)

Sources

Birds
Kangaroo Island, South Australia

Birds of Kangaroo Island, South Australia